The 2014–15 CONCACAF Champions League (officially the 2014–15 Scotiabank CONCACAF Champions League for sponsorship reasons starting from 2015) was the 7th edition of the CONCACAF Champions League under its current name, and overall the 50th edition of the premier football club competition organized by CONCACAF, the regional governing body of North America, Central America, and the Caribbean.

In the final, Mexican team América defeated Canadian team Montreal Impact 5–3 on aggregate to win their sixth CONCACAF club title (and their first during the CONCACAF Champions League era), tying the record of the most CONCACAF club title with Cruz Azul (who were the defending champions, but were eliminated in the group stage). The final marked the first time, where a Canadian based team took part in. As the winners of the 2014–15 CONCACAF Champions League, América earned the right to represent CONCACAF at the 2015 FIFA Club World Cup.

Qualification

A total of 24 teams participate in the CONCACAF Champions League: nine from the North American Zone (from three associations), twelve from the Central American Zone (from at most seven associations), and three from the Caribbean Zone (from at most three associations).

Clubs may be disqualified and replaced by a club from another association if the club does not have an available stadium that meets CONCACAF regulations for safety. If a club's own stadium fails to meet the set standards then it may find a suitable replacement stadium within its own country. However, if it is still determined that the club cannot provide the adequate facilities then it runs the risk of being replaced.

North America
Nine teams from the North American Football Union qualify to the Champions League. Mexico and the United States are each allocated four berths, the most of any of CONCACAF's member associations, while Canada is granted one berth in the tournament.

For Mexico, the winners of Liga MX Apertura and Clausura tournaments earn berths in Pot A of the tournament's group stage, while the Apertura and Clausura runners-up earn berths in Pot B.

For the United States, three berths are allocated through the Major League Soccer (MLS) regular season and playoffs; the fourth berth is allocated to the winner of its domestic cup competition, the Lamar Hunt U.S. Open Cup. The MLS Cup winner and the Supporters' Shield winner (if U.S.-based) are placed in Pot A; the other regular season conference winner (if U.S.-based) and the U.S. Open Cup winner are placed in Pot B. If any of the above berths are taken by a Canada-based MLS team, the Champions League place is allocated to the U.S.-based team with the best MLS regular season record who has failed to otherwise qualify.

For Canada, the winner of the domestic cup competition, the Voyageurs Cup competed for in the Canadian Championship, earns the lone Canadian berth into the tournament, in Pot B.

Central America
Twelve teams from the Central American Football Union qualify to the Champions League. The allocation is as follows: two berths for each of Costa Rica, Honduras, Guatemala, Panama and El Salvador, and one berth for each of Nicaragua and Belize.

For the Central American teams that qualify via split seasons, the aggregate record of the two tournaments within the season is used to determine which team gains the association's top berth. The pots of the teams are as follows:
The top teams from the leagues of Costa Rica, Honduras, Guatemala and Panama are placed in Pot A.
The top team from the league of El Salvador, and the second teams from the leagues of Costa Rica and Honduras are placed in Pot B.
The second teams from the leagues of Guatemala, Panama and El Salvador, and the teams from the leagues of Nicaragua and Belize are placed in Pot C.

If one or more clubs is precluded, it is supplanted by a club from another Central American association. The reallocation is based on results from previous Champions League tournaments.

Caribbean
Three teams from the Caribbean Football Union qualify to the Champions League. The three berths, in Pot C, are allocated to the top three finishers of the CFU Club Championship, a subcontinental tournament for clubs from associations of the Caribbean Football Union. In order for a team to qualify for the CFU Club Championship, they usually need to finish as the champion or runner-up of their respective association's league in the previous season, but professional teams may also be selected by their associations if they play in the league of another country.

If any Caribbean club is precluded, it is supplanted by the fourth-place finisher from the CFU Club Championship.

Teams
The following 24 teams (from 12 associations) qualified for the tournament.

In the following table, the number of appearances, last appearance, and previous best result count only those in the CONCACAF Champions League era starting from 2008–09 (not counting those in the era of the Champions' Cup from 1962 to 2008).

Notes

Draw
The draw for the group stage was held on May 28, 2014 at Doral, Florida, United States.

The 24 teams were drawn into eight groups of three, with each group containing one team from each of the three pots. The allocation of teams into pots was based on their national association and qualifying berth. Teams from the same association could not be drawn with each other in the group stage, and each group was guaranteed to contain a team from either the United States or Mexico, meaning U.S. and Mexican teams could not play each other in the group stage.

Notes

Schedule
The schedule of the competition was as follows.

Group stage

In the group stage, each group was played on a home-and-away round-robin basis. The winners of each group advanced to the championship stage.

Tiebreakers
The teams were ranked according to points (3 points for a win, 1 point for a draw, 0 points for a loss). If tied on points, tiebreakers would be applied in the following order:
Greater number of points earned in matches between the teams concerned;
Greater goal difference in matches between the teams concerned;
Greater number of goals scored away from home in matches between the teams concerned;
Reapply first three criteria if two or more teams are still tied;
Greater goal difference in all group matches;
Greater number of goals scored in group matches;
Greater number of goals scored away in all group matches;
Drawing of lots.

Group 1

Group 2

Group 3

Group 4

Group 5

Group 6

Group 7

Group 8

Championship stage

In the championship stage, the eight teams played a single-elimination tournament. Each tie was played on a home-and-away two-legged basis. The away goals rule would be used if the aggregate score was level after normal time of the second leg, but not after extra time, and so a tie would be decided by penalty shoot-out if the aggregate score was level after extra time of the second leg.

Seeding
The qualified teams were seeded 1–8 in the championship stage according to their results in the group stage.

Bracket
The bracket of the championship stage was determined by the seeding as follows:
Quarterfinals: Seed 1 vs. Seed 8 (QF1), Seed 2 vs. Seed 7 (QF2), Seed 3 vs. Seed 6 (QF3), Seed 4 vs. Seed 5 (QF4), with seeds 1–4 hosting the second leg
Semifinals: Winner QF1 vs. Winner QF4 (SF1), Winner QF2 vs. Winner QF3 (SF2), with winners QF1 and QF2 hosting the second leg
Finals: Winner SF1 vs. Winner SF2, with winner SF1 hosting the second leg

Quarterfinals

Semifinals

Final

Awards

Top goalscorers

See also
2015 FIFA Club World Cup

References

External links
CONCACAF Champions League , CONCACAF.com

 
1
CONCACAF Champions League seasons